The Rural Municipality of Swan River is a former rural municipality (RM) in the Canadian province of Manitoba. It was originally incorporated as a rural municipality on May 1, 1901. It ceased on January 1, 2015 as a result of its provincially mandated amalgamation with the Village of Benito to form the Municipality of Swan Valley West.

The former RM is located in the Parkland Region of the province, adjacent to the Province of Saskatchewan, and surrounds the Town of Swan River. It had a population of 2,784 in the 2006 census. The southernmost part of Manitoba's Porcupine Provincial Forest is located within the northern portion of the former RM.

Communities 
Benito
Durban
Kenville

References 

 Manitoba Municipalities: Rural Municipality of Swan River
 Map of Swan River R.M. at Statcan

External links 
 Rural Municipality of Swan River (copy archived January 3, 2015)

Swan River
Populated places disestablished in 2015
2015 disestablishments in Manitoba